The Girl from the Marsh Croft (Swedish: Tösen från Stormyrtorpet) is a 1947 Swedish drama film directed by Gustaf Edgren and starring Margareta Fahlén, Alf Kjellin and Sten Lindgren. It is based on the 1908 novella of the same name by Selma Lagerlöf. The film's sets were designed by the art director Nils Svenwall.

Cast 
Margareta Fahlén as Helga
 Alf Kjellin as Gudmund Erlandsson
 Sten Lindgren as Eriksson
 Ingrid Borthen as Hildur
 Keve Hjelm as Johan
 Oscar Ljung as Per Martinsson
 Carl Ström as Erland Erlandsson
 Anna Carlsten as Ingeborg Erlandsson
 Sven d'Ailly as Karl Nilsson
 Inez Lundmark-Hermelin  as Helga's Mother
 Gösta Cederlund as Frithiof Pettersson
 Erik Berglund as Svensson
 Artur Rolén as 	Guest at the party
 Sven Bergvall as 	Martinsson, Per's father 
 Gull Natorp as Fortuneteller 
 Ivar Kåge as Priest 
 Artur Cederborgh as 	Parish constable
 Wiktor Andersson as Cryer
 Greta Berthels as 	Stina, maid at Närlunda 
 Gösta Bodin as 	Major at mayor's ball

References

Bibliography 
 Qvist, Per Olov & von Bagh, Peter. Guide to the Cinema of Sweden and Finland. Greenwood Publishing Group, 2000.

External links 
 
 http://www.svenskfilmdatabas.se/en/item/?type=film&itemid=4189

1947 films
Swedish drama films
1947 drama films
1940s Swedish-language films
Films directed by Gustaf Edgren
Films based on works by Selma Lagerlöf
1940s Swedish films